Bernard Stamm, is a Swiss professional yachtsman, born on 29 November 1963 in Geneva, Switzerland.

He is an offshore sailor have started the Vendee Globe three times but never officially completed the course. He did not have any luck starting in the race starting in the 2000-2001 edition where he retired after a week of racing because of auto pilot failure. In 2004-2005, he lost his keel in the Transat race five months before the start so didn't make the start. In the 2008-2009 he collided with a cargo vessel on the first night and had to return to repair his bowsprit and mast. Setting out again three and a half days after his rivals, he got half way round before discovering a problem with his rudder bearings and attempted to find safe harbor in the Kerguelens but bad weather made it impossible to moor despite outside help, and the boat had to be abandoned. In 2012-2013 edition he did complete the course but was disqualified from the race before the finish.

He was rescued in 2013 after his boat was hit by a large wave in severe weather on the way back from the Transat Jacques Vabre.

Gallery

Race result highlights

IMOCA 60 Owned

References

External links

Facebook Page

1963 births
Living people
Sportspeople from Geneva
Swiss male sailors (sport)
IMOCA 60 class sailors
2000 Vendee Globe sailors
2008 Vendee Globe sailors
2012 Vendee Globe sailors
Swiss Vendee Globe sailors
Single-handed circumnavigating sailors